Josue Matías (born January 6, 1993) is a former gridiron football guard who last played for the Ottawa Redblacks. He played college football at Florida State. Upon signing with the Tennessee Titans in 2015, he became the first Dominican-born player in the NFL.

Early years
Matías was born in the Dominican Republic and moved to Union City, New Jersey with his family when he was six. He attended Union City High School. Matías was a four-star recruit by Rivals.com. He originally committed to Rutgers University to play college football but changed to Florida State University.

College career
After spending his true freshman season in 2011 as a backup, Matías started all 13 games as a sophomore in 2012. As a junior in 2013, he started all 14 games, including the 2014 BCS National Championship Game. He returned as a starter his senior season in 2014.

Professional career

Tennessee Titans
Matias signed with the Tennessee Titans as an undrafted free agent following the 2015 NFL Draft. He was waived on September 5, 2015 and was signed to the practice squad the next day, where he spent his entire rookie season.

On August 17, 2016, Matias was waived/injured by the Titans after suffering a torn patellar tendon and was placed on injured reserve.

On September 2, 2017, Matias was waived by the Titans.

Ottawa Redblacks 
Matias joined the Ottawa Redblacks in June 2018. He started his first game since the 2015 Rose Bowl in October 2018.

Matias announced his retirement from football on March 30, 2019.

References

External links
Florida State Seminoles bio

1993 births
Living people
Sportspeople from Union City, New Jersey
Players of American football from New Jersey
American football offensive guards
Florida State Seminoles football players
Tennessee Titans players
Ottawa Redblacks players
Canadian football offensive linemen